Parafreutreta pretoriae is a species of tephritid or fruit flies in the genus Parafreutreta of the family Tephritidae.

Distribution
South Africa.

References

Tephritinae
Insects described in 1929
Diptera of Africa